The 1892 European Figure Skating Championships were held on January 24. Elite figure skaters competed for the title of European Champion in the category of men's singles. The competitors performed only compulsory figures.

The skating associations of Germany and Austria had joined to become, "Deutscher und Österreichischer Eislaufverband", and had organised these second European Championships in figure skating in Vienna, Austria in 1892, before the International Skating Union (ISU) was founded. The ISU then organised subsequent Championships.

Results

Men

Judges:
 L. Stickler 
 J. Ehrlich 
 M. Mitscha 
 F. Wolff 
 Bieberhofer 
 C. Felgel 
 C. Fillunger 
 E. Schmidt 
 A. Tuschel 
 M. Wirth

References

Sources
 Result List provided by the ISU

European Figure Skating Championships, 1892
European Figure Skating Championships
1892 in Austrian sport
International figure skating competitions hosted by Austria
Sports competitions in Vienna
1890s in Vienna
January 1892 sports events